The Vallenato Legend Festival is one of the most important musical festivals in Colombia. The festival features a vallenato music contests for best performer of accordion, caja vallenata and guacharaca, as well as piqueria (battle of lyrics) and best song. It's celebrated every year in April in the city of Valledupar, Department of Cesar.

Origins
Its origin dates back to 1968 when the celebrated vallenato composer Rafael Escalona, the then governor of the Cesar Department and former president of the republic of Colombia, Alfonso López Michelsen, and the writer, journalist and former Minister of Culture Consuelo Araújo, came up with the idea of organizing a festival that celebrated vallenato, a musical genre native to Colombia’s northern Atlantic coast and also celebrate a religious festivity of "The Virgin of the Rosario".

Since 1986, this festival has been organized by the Fundación Festival de la Leyenda Vallenata (Vallenato Legend Festival Foundation), a non-profit private entity in charge of the promotion, publicity, and defense of vallenato music as one of the intangible cultural legacies of Colombia.

The Legend: The legend says that during the Spanish colonial period, two Amerindian tribes from the Tairona culture, the Tupe and the Chimila, along with other members of other tribes, rebelled against the Spanish colonizers after one indigenous woman named Francisca, who worked as a maid for a Spanish family, was severely punished by her jealous master, who cut her hair and whipped her publicly. One of her fellow Indian tribesmen also working for the Spaniards, escaped, and told his tribe's cacique about this offensive insult. The angry Indians organized an attack, destroying most of the town and killing many people. When they tried to destroy the temple, the "Virgin of the Rosario" appeared and blocked their arrows with her cape, preventing them from destroying it. The natives, scared, escaped to the Sierra Nevada de Santa Marta, and knowing that the Spaniards would follow them and would be in need of drinking water, they poisoned the "Sicarare lake". This resulted in the death of all the Spaniards involved. The Virgin reappeared and began touching their bodies with her wand and reviving them. The surprised Indians finally surrendered.

The Contests

The most important event during the celebration of this festival is the vallenato musical contest. The winners are chosen by a vallenato experienced jury that evaluate the contestants’ prowess in the four main rhythms which are paseo, son, puya and merengue. There are several categories in which the contestants may participate including: "professional accordion player", "amateur accordion player", "young accordion player", "best new vallenato song", and piquerías (in which each competitor's goal is to 'diss' their opponent through clever lyrics).

Besides the annual winners, there is also a special award given to renowned vallenato composers and performers, a statuette known as La Pilonera Mayor, which is given in recognition of the recipient’s dedication to vallenato music. La Pilonera Mayor is the highest honor given to a vallenato musician in Colombia and only six composers have received it until now. This award is given in honoris memoriam of disappeared Consuelo Araújo.

 Judges for competitions are selected by the Board of Directors of the Vallenato Legend Festival Foundation (Fundacion Festival de la Leyenda Vallenata) and must be affiliated members.

King of Kings
The Rey de Reyes festival editions occur every ten years, since 1987 and only previous winners can participate. The first winner was Colacho Mendoza, followed by Gonzalo "Cocha" Molina, the third King of Kings Hugo Carlos Granados won on May 1, 2007.

Winners
La Pilonera Mayor Award:
Emiliano Zuleta Baquero, Rafael Escalona, Leandro Díaz, Calixto Ochoa, Adolfo Pacheco and Tobías Enrique Pumarejo.

Dances and other events
Piloneras Parade: This traditional dance was recovered from extinction in 1994 thanks  to the Vallenato Legend Festival Foundation effort, and was added to the festival's programming as the opening show. This dance is traditional of the magdalena river reveres. Traditionally Dancers paraded on the streets using a giant wooden mortar and pestle, (usually used to squash corn and produce corn flour), the men and women danced around the 'corn smashing' in a courteous and flirting way, dancing in front of friend's houses to receive liquor in exchange. But the festival kept the dance and turned it into a competition among groups of Piloneros and whoever exposes the best show becomes the winner. There are three categories: children (under 14), youth (14–18), and adults .

Other events: 
 Record labels present their best artists and orchestras throughout the Festival, usually before, during recess of events and after competition.
 Many Nightclubs and Event Centers offer alternative parties with vallenato musical groups and other orchestras.
 Certain families affiliated to this Festival often throw open "parrandas" or parties to special guests and friends.
 The festival also sponsors cultural activities related to the festival; debates, symposia, panel discussions, traditional storytelling, paintings expositions, artesanias and book expositions, among other cultural events.
 Valledupar and surrounding towns have cockfight arenas, that have tournaments during the Festival dates. This sport considered brutal for some represent a major attraction for locals and some tourists, but are not sponsored by the Vallenato Legend Festival. This sport is a strong traditional hobby for some locals (passion for some) mixed with vallenato "parrandas" and much gambling.

See also

List of music festivals in Colombia  
List of folk festivals

References

External links
  

 

April events
Valledupar
Music festivals in Colombia
Tourist attractions in Cesar Department
Music festivals established in 1968
Folk festivals in Colombia
Vallenato